Praxis, full name Praxis Doe-Het-Zelf Center B.V. (Praxis Do-It-Yourself Centre B.V.) is a Dutch Hardware store-chain, with head-office in Diemen. The company started in 1978 in Venlo and as of 2009 it has 136 stores spread over the Netherlands of which 26 have an extended assortment, the so called "Megastores". Praxis employs about 5000 people.

Praxis focusses on construction products and on decorative do-it-yourself products. It also supplies garden materials. It is known to the general public for its sponsoring of the RTL 4 television program Eigen Huis & Tuin since 1990.

Praxis is part of the Maxeda retail group. Current board member of Maxeda responsible for the DIY section is Nick Wilkinson.

References

External links 
 Praxis.nl Official website of Praxis
 Praxis on maxeda.com

Retail companies established in 1978
Companies based in North Holland